Gabrje is a Slovene place name that may refer to:

Gabrje, Dobrova–Polhov Gradec, a village in the Municipality of Dobrova–Polhov Gradec, central Slovenia
Gabrje, Novo Mesto, a village in the Municipality of Novo Mesto, southeastern Slovenia
Gabrje, Sevnica, a village in the Municipality of Sevnica, central-eastern Slovenia
Gabrje, Tolmin, a village in the Municipality of Tolmin, northwestern Slovenia
Gabrje pod Limbarsko Goro, a village in the Municipality of Moravče, central Slovenia
Gabrje pod Špilkom, a village in the Municipality of Lukovica, central Slovenia
Gabrje pri Dobovi, a village in the Municipality of Brežice, southeastern Slovenia
Gabrje pri Ilovi Gori, a village in the Municipality of Grosuplje, southeastern Slovenia
Gabrje pri Jančah, a village in the City Municipality of Ljubljana, central Slovenia
Gabrje pri Soteski, a village in the Municipality of Dolenjske Toplice, southeastern Slovenia
Gabrje pri Stični, a village in the Municipality of Ivančna Gorica, southeastern Slovenia